The Lauter is a river in Baden-Württemberg, Germany. It passes through Spiegelberg and flows into the Murr near Sulzbach an der Murr.

See also
List of rivers of Baden-Württemberg

References

Rivers of Baden-Württemberg
Rivers of Germany